Nathan Palmer Jr. (born September 23, 1989) is a former American football linebacker. He played college football at Illinois State. Palmer was selected by the Green Bay Packers in the sixth round of the 2013 NFL Draft.

Early life
Palmer was born in Chicago and attended Simeon Career Academy. During his time there, he lettered in baseball, track and field, basketball, and football. Palmer was also a teammate to future Chicago Bulls point guard Derrick Rose. In football, he played defensive end, tight end, linebacker, and on the offensive line. He only played four games during his junior year due to injury, however he still had 30 tackles and seven sacks. As a senior, Palmer had 128 tackles and 18 sacks on defense, while catching 10 passes for 250 yards and a touchdown on offense. His performance earned him a spot on the 2007 Chicago Sun-Times All-Public League Team.

He was listed as a three star prospect by Rivals.com and as the 17th best player in the state of Illinois. Palmer received one scholarship offer from Illinois.

College career
Palmer began his college career at Illinois. He was redshirted his first year with the team. He played in every game in the 2009 season, primarily on special teams. He had two tackles against Ohio State, and one against Cincinnati. Additionally, he earned Academic All-Big Ten honors for the year. He played in nine games and recorded six tackles the following year.

Palmer transferred to the Illinois State and earned a starting spot at defensive end. He started every game in his first season for the Redbirds. In a game against Morehead State, he recorded a sack and recovered a fumble for a 42-yard touchdown, the first of his college career. Later, when Illinois State played North Dakota State, Palmer posted a career-high eight tackles. His performance for the season earned him All-Missouri Valley Conference honors at the end of the season. He finished up his junior year with 9.5 sacks, leading the conference. He also had 46 tackles and two forced fumbles. During the final year of his college football career, Palmer again started every game of the season as a defensive end. During a game against Missouri State, he achieved a career-high nine tackles. He finished his career again being named to the All-Missouri Valley Football Conference second-team.

Professional career

Green Bay Packers
Palmer was selected in the sixth round (193rd overall) by the Green Bay Packers in the 2013 NFL Draft. On May 10, 2013, he signed a contract with the Packers.

On August 30, 2014, Palmer was placed on injured reserve.

Palmer was released by the Packers on April 8, 2016.

Tennessee Titans
On April 11, 2016, Palmer was claimed off waivers by the Tennessee Titans. In 2016, Palmer notched a team-leading 12 special teams tackles.

On March 9, 2017, Palmer re-signed with the Titans. In 2017, he posted 10 special teams tackles, marking two consecutive seasons with double-digit special teams stops.

On August 7, 2018, Palmer was placed on injured reserve after being carted off in practice with a leg injury.

NFL statistics
Source: NFL.com

References

External links
 Tennessee Titans bio
 
 Illinois State Redbirds bio
 Illinois Fighting Illini bio
 

1989 births
Living people
Players of American football from Chicago
American football defensive ends
American football linebackers
Illinois Fighting Illini football players
Illinois State Redbirds football players
Green Bay Packers players
Tennessee Titans players